Donald Johnson and Francisco Montana were the defending champions, but decided to compete in Stuttgart at the same week

Nicolás Lapentti and Daniel Orsanic won the title by defeating Luis Herrera and Mariano Sánchez 4–6, 6–3, 7–6 in the final.

Seeds

Draw

Draw

References

External links
 Official results archive (ATP)
 Official results archive (ITF)

1997 ATP Tour